This is an alphabetical list of American television actresses who have articles on Wikipedia.

Some actors who are well-known for both film and TV work are also included in the list of American film actresses.

A 

Paula Abdul born 
Donzaleigh Abernathy born 
Amy Acker born 
Danneel Ackles born  
Amy Adams born 
Joey Lauren Adams born 
Mary Kay Adams born 
Pamela Adlon born 
Keiko Agena born 
Dianna Agron born 
Christina Aguilera born 
Lexi Ainsworth born 
Malin Åkerman born 
Mackenzie Aladjem born 
Jessica Alba born 
Lola Albright (1924-2017)
Kristen Alderson born 
Brooke Alexander born 
Denise Alexander born 
Erika Alexander born 
Khandi Alexander born 
Olivia Alexander born 
Sasha Alexander born 
Kim Alexis born 
Kristian Alfonso born 
Tatyana Ali born 
Ana Alicia born 
Christa B. Allen born 
Crystal Allen born 
Debbie Allen born 
Jonelle Allen born 
Krista Allen born 
Rosalind Allen born 
Kirstie Alley born 
Lindsey Alley born 
Daniella Alonso born 
María Conchita Alonso born 
Cristela Alonzo born 
Carol Alt born 
Amerie born 
Rachel Ames born 
Mädchen Amick born 
Andrea Anders born 
Barbara Anderson born 
Gillian Anderson born 
Jolene Anderson born 
Loni Anderson born 
Melissa Sue Anderson born 
Melody Anderson born 
Pamela Anderson born 
Heather Angel (1909-1986)
Vanessa Angel born 
Maya Angelou (1928-2014)
Jennifer Aniston born 
Victoria Ann Lewis
Susan Anton born 
Shiri Appleby born 
Christina Applegate born 
Amy Aquino born 
Lisa Arch born 
Anne Archer born 
Beverly Archer born 
Melissa Archer born 
Eve Arden (1908-1990)
Ashley Argota born 
Karin Argoud born 
Jillian Armenante born 
Bess Armstrong born 
Lucie Arnaz born 
Jeannetta Arnette born 
Tichina Arnold born 
Amy Aquino born 
Alexis Arquette (1969-2016)
Patricia Arquette born 
Rosanna Arquette born 
Lisa Arrindell Anderson born 
Bea Arthur (1922-2009)
Nina Arvesen born 
Erica Ash born 
Ashanti born 
Daphne Ashbrook born 
Elizabeth Ashley born 
Karan Ashley born 
Jennifer Aspen born 
Essence Atkins born 
Jayne Atkinson born 
Alana Austin born 
Karen Austin born 
Margaret Avery born 
Shondrella Avery born 
Awkwafina born 
Reiko Aylesworth born 
Leah Ayres born 
Rochelle Aytes born 
Valerie Azlynn born 
Candice Azzara born

B 

Barbara Babcock born 
Lauren Bacall (1924-2014)
Morena Baccarin born 
Catherine Bach born 
Jillian Bach born 
Pamela Bach
Hermione Baddeley (1906-1986)
Vanessa Baden born 
Jane Badler born 
Lorri Bagley born 
Katherine Bailess born 
Chloe Bailey born 
Halle Bailey born 
Adrienne Bailon born 
Barbara Bain born 
Robin Bain born 
Diora Baird born 
Maggie Baird 
Pamela Baird born 
Sharon Baird
Baiyu
Amanda Baker born 
Ann Baker (1930-2017)
Becky Ann Baker born 
Blanche Baker born 
Diane Baker born 1938
Kathy Baker born 
LaVern Baker (1929-1997)
Leigh-Allyn Baker born 
Brenda Bakke born 
Rebecca Balding (1948-2022)
Hailey Baldwin born 
Fairuza Balk born 
Lucille Ball (1911-1989)
Kaye Ballard (1925-2019)
Kimee Balmilero born 
Anne Bancroft (1931-2005)
Lisa Banes (1955-2021)
Elizabeth Banks born 
Sasha Banks born 
Tyra Banks born 
Christine Baranski born 
Olivia Barash born 
Adrienne Barbeau born 
Carol Barbee born 
Andrea Barber born 
Jenni Barber born 
Jillian Barberie born 
Sara Bareilles born 
Ellen Barkin born 
Joanna Barnes (1934-2022)
Priscilla Barnes born 
Anita Barone born 
Judith Barcroft born 
Hayley Barr born 
Julia Barr born 
Roseanne Barr born 
Tara Lynne Barr born 
Alice Barrett born 
Majel Barrett (1932-2008)
Nancy Barrett born 
Barbara Barrie born 
Dana Barron 
Patricia Barry (1921-2016)
Drew Barrymore born 
Jayden Bartels born 
Joanie Bartels born 
Jessica Barth
Lynsey Bartilson born 
Bonnie Bartlett born 
Robin Bartlett born 
Mischa Barton born 
Ella Jay Basco born 
Toni Basil born 
Kim Basinger born 
Angela Bassett born 
Brec Bassinger born 
Justine Bateman
Angelique Bates born 
Kathy Bates born 
Ryan Michelle Bathe born 
Charita Bauer (1922-1985)
Jamie Lyn Bauer born 
Elizabeth Baur born (1947-2017)
Frances Bavier born (1902-1989)
Anne Baxter born (1923-1985)
Meredith Baxter born 
Frances Bay (1919-2011)
Susan Bay born 
Vanessa Bayer born 
Jennifer Beals born 
Amanda Bearse 
Allyce Beasley 
Stephanie Beatriz born 
Garcelle Beauvais born 
Jenny Beck born 
Kimberly Beck born 
Noelle Beck born 
Roxanne Beckford born 
Becky G born 
Bonnie Bedelia born 
Samantha Bee born 
Leslie Bega born 
Beth Behrs born 
Barbara Bel Geddes (1922-2005)
Shari Belafonte born 
Christine Belford 
Anna Belknap born 
Catherine Bell born 
Emma Bell born 
Felecia M. Bell born 
Kristen Bell born 
Lake Bell born 
Lauralee Bell born 
Diana Bellamy (1943-2001)
Kathleen Beller born 
Troian Bellisario born 
Maria Bello born 
Pamela Bellwood 
Bea Benaderet (1906-1968)
Landry Bender born 
Lourdes Benedicto born 
Annette Bening born 
Rhona Bennett born 
Melissa Benoist born 
Amber Benson born 
Ashley Benson born 
Jodi Benson born 
Lucille Benson (1914-1984)
Wendy Benson born 
Julie Benz 
Blaze Berdahl born 
Paris Berelc born 
Gertrude Berg (1899-1966)
Judith-Marie Bergan (1948-2016)
Candice Bergen born 
Frances Bergen (1923-2006)
Polly Bergen (1930-2014)
Kelli Berglund born 
Ingrid Bergman (1915-1982)
Jaime Bergman born 
Elizabeth Berkley born 
Julie Marie Berman born 
Julissa Bermudez born 
Crystal Bernard born 
Susan Bernard (1948-2019)
Sandra Bernhard born 
Elizabeth Berridge born 
Halle Berry born 
Valerie Bertinelli born 
Bibi Besch (1942-1996)
Martine Beswick born 
Jaclyn Betham 
Beyoncé born 
Mayim Bialik born 
Leslie Bibb born 
Camren Bicondova born 
Jessica Biel born 
Sissy Biggers born 
Alexandra Billings born 
Barbara Billingsley (1915-2010)
Jennifer Billingsley
Rachel Bilson born 
Traci Bingham
Thora Birch born 
Billie Bird (1908-2002)
Kelly Bishop born 
Meredith Bishop born 
Josie Bissett born 
Nadia Bjorlin born 
Karen Black (1939-2013)
Sofia Black-D'Elia born 
Nina Blackwood
Linda Blair born 
Pamela Blair born 
Patricia Blair (1933-2013)
Selma Blair born 
Amanda Blake (1929-1989)
Madge Blake (1899-1969)
Nzinga Blake born 1981
Whitney Blake (1926-2002)
Rachel Blakely born 
Susan Blakely 
Ronee Blakley born 
Jolene Blalock born 
Jennifer Blanc 
Rachel Blanchard born 
Tammy Blanchard born 
Rosa Blasi born 
Alexis Bledel born 
Tempestt Bledsoe born 
Yasmine Bleeth born 
Mary J. Blige born 
Lindsay Bloom 
Rachel Bloom born 
Vail Bloom 
Lisa Blount (1957-2010)
Susan Blu 
Heidi Bohay born 
Corinne Bohrer born 
Lisa Bonet born 
Lesley Boone born 
Megan Boone born 
Mika Boorem born 
Shirley Booth (1898-1992)
Alex Borstein born 
Lucy Boryer born 
Samantha Boscarino born 
Barbara Bosson born 
Rachel Boston born 
Kate Bosworth born 
Katrina Bowden born 
Lilan Bowden born 
Andrea Bowen born 
Clare Bowen born 
Julie Bowen born 
April Bowlby 
Jessica Bowman born 
Jenna Boyd born 
Nikki Boyer born 
Lara Flynn Boyle born 
Lucy Boynton 
Elizabeth Bracco
Lorraine Bracco born 
Kathleen Bradley 
Sônia Braga born 
Vanessa Branch born 
Alicia Brandt 
Betsy Brandt
Laura Branigan (1952-2004)
Brigid Brannagh born 
Da Brat born 
Tamara Braun born 
Ciara Bravo born 
Stephanie Braxton born 
Tamar Braxton born 
Trina Braxton born 
Deanne Bray born 
Alexandra Breckenridge 
Laura Breckenridge born 
Tracey E. Bregman 
Eileen Brennan (1932-2013)
Amy Brenneman born 
Ashleigh Brewer born 
Jordana Brewster born 
Paget Brewster born 
Angelica Bridges born 
Chloe Bridges born 
Alison Brie born 
Christie Brinkley born  
Danielle Brisebois born 
Tiffany Brissette born 
Morgan Brittany 
Barbara Britton (1920-1980)
Connie Britton born 
Pamela Britton (1923-1974)
Kara Brock born 
Beth Broderick born 
Lois Bromfield 
Jayne Brook
Aimee Brooks born 
Angelle Brooks 
Danielle Brooks born 
Deanna Brooks born 
Elisabeth Brooks (1951-1997)
Golden Brooks 
Kimberly Brooks
Blair Brown born 
Bobbie Brown born 
Brianna Brown born 
Candace Brown born 
Candy Brown born 
Charnele Brown born 
Chelsea Brown (1942-2017)
Downtown Julie Brown 
Julie Brown born 
Kimberlin Brown born 
Kimberly J. Brown 
Olivia Brown born 
Pat Crawford Brown (1929-2019)
Rhyon Nicole Brown born 
Sarah Joy Brown born 
Susan Brown (1932-2018)
Yvette Nicole Brown born 
Logan Browning born 
Agnes Bruckner born 
Amy Bruckner born 
Ellen Bry born 
Sabrina Bryan born 
Clara Bryant born 
Joy Bryant 
Karyn Bryant born 
Jensen Buchanan born 
Tara Buck born 
Betty Buckley born 
Rebecca Budig born 
Joyce Bulifant born 
Sandra Bullock born 
Kylie Bunbury born 
Brooke Bundy 
Laura Bell Bundy born 
Cara Buono 
Candace Cameron Bure born 
Brooke Burke born 
Delta Burke born 
Michelle Burke born 
Carol Burnett born 
Molly Burnett born 
Olivia Burnette born 
Brooke Burns born 
Catherine Burns (1945-2019)
Catherine Lloyd Burns 
Maryedith Burrell born 
Nakia Burrise born 
Hedy Burress born 
Saffron Burrows born 
Kandi Burruss born 
Ellen Burstyn born 
Hilarie Burton born 
Sophia Bush born 
Brett Butler born 
Yancy Butler born 
Sarah G. Buxton 
Grace Byers born 
Amanda Bynes born 
Martha Byrne born 
Darcy Rose Byrnes born 
Jean Byron (1925-2006)

C 

Mary Cadorette 
Erin Cahill born 
Paula Cale born 
Monica Calhoun born 
K Callan born 
Vanessa Bell Calloway born 
Sadie Calvano born 
Dove Cameron born 
Joanna Cameron (1948-2021)
Colleen Camp born 
Christa Campbell born 
Danielle Campbell born 
Maia Campbell born 
Neve Campbell born 
Tisha Campbell born 
Maria Canals-Barrera born 
Lisa Canning born 
Sara Canning born 
Dyan Cannon born 
Katherine Cannon born 
Kay Cannon born 
Francesca Capaldi born 
Virginia Capers (1925-2004)
Lizzy Caplan born 
Twink Caplan born 
Jessica Capshaw born 
Kate Capshaw born 
Irene Cara (1959-2022)
Linda Cardellini born 
D'Arcy Carden born 
Cardi B born 
Clare Carey born 
Mariah Carey born 
Amy Carlson born 
Karen Carlson born 
Kelly Carlson born 
Linda Carlson (1945-2021)
Charisma Carpenter born 
Sabrina Carpenter born 
Thelma Carpenter (1922-1997)
Darleen Carr 
Ever Carradine
Barbara Carrera
Tia Carrere born 
Diahann Carroll (1935-2019)
Pat Carroll (1927-2022)
Crystal Carson born 
Jean Carson (1923-2005)
Lisa Nicole Carson born 
Sofia Carson born 
Victoria Cartagena born 
Dixie Carter (1939-2010)
Lynda Carter born 
Nell Carter (1948-2003)
Gabrielle Carteris born 
Nancy Cartwright born 
Veronica Cartwright born 
Mary Carver (1924-2013)
Sharon Case born 
Rosalind Cash (1938-1995)
Peggy Cass (1924-1999)
Joanna Cassidy born 
Tricia Cast born 
Peggie Castle (1927-1973)
Shanley Caswell born 
Adriana Cataño
Catrina born 
Mary Jo Catlett born 
Kim Cattrall born 
Emma Caulfield born 
Joan Caulfield (1922-1991)
Kristin Cavallari born 
Megan Cavanagh born 
Christine Cavanaugh (1963-2014)
Cha Cha
Lacey Chabert born 
Sarah Chalke born 
Christina Chambers born 
Elizabeth Chambers born 
Erin Chambers born 
Jacki R. Chan born 
JuJu Chan 
Michele B. Chan
Christina Chang born 
Carol Channing (1921-2019)
Stockard Channing born 
Rosalind Chao born 
Judith Chapman born 
Lanei Chapman born 
Crystal Chappell born 
Leslie Charleson born 
Charo 
Melanie Chartoff born 
Daveigh Chase born 
Molly Cheek born 
Kristin Chenoweth born 
Cher born 
Lois Chiles born 
Margaret Cho born 
Rae Dawn Chong born 
Robbi Chong born 
Priyanka Chopra born 
Claudia Christian 
Robin Christopher born  
Danielle Chuchran born 
Marguerite Churchill (1910-2000)
Jamie Chung born 
Chyna (1969-2016)
Cree Cicchino born 
Natalia Cigliuti born 
Ashley Monique Clark born 
Candy Clark 
Christie Clark born 
Doran Clark born 
Melinda Clarke 
Sarah Clarke born 
Kelly Clarkson born 
Lana Clarkson (1962-2003)
Patricia Clarkson born 
Jill Clayburgh (1944-2010)
Amanda Clayton born 
Jamie Clayton born 
Ellen Cleghorne born 
Kiersey Clemons born 
Odessa Cleveland
Rosemary Clooney (1928-2002)
Glenn Close born 
Imogene Coca (1908-2001)
Annalisa Cochrane born 
Claire Coffee born 
Kelly Coffield Park born 
Mindy Cohn born 
Taylor Cole born 
Tina Cole born 
Monique Coleman born 
Robin Coleman born 
Kim Coles born 
Margaret Colin born 
Joan Collins born 
Mo Collins born 
Tru Collins 
Holly Marie Combs born 
Darlene Conley (1934-2007)
Michaela Conlin born 
Didi Conn born 
Jennifer Connelly born 
Kristen Connolly born 
Lauren Conrad born 
Frances Conroy born 
Angell Conwell born 
A. J. Cook born 
Rachael Leigh Cook 
Jennifer Coolidge born 
Felisha Cooper born 
Jeanne Cooper (1928-2013)
Teri Copley born 
Alicia Coppola 
Gretchen Corbett born 
Ellen Corby (1911-1999)
Maddie Corman born 
Lydia Cornell born 
Miranda Cosgrove born 
Eliza Coupe born 
Courteney Cox born 
Laverne Cox born 
Nikki Cox born 
Yvonne Craig (1937-2015)
Christina Crawford born 1939
Cindy Crawford born 
Rachael Crawford born 1969
Leanna Creel born 
Wendy Crewson born 
Nancy Criss 
Cathy Lee Crosby born  
Denise Crosby 
Mary Crosby born 
Marcia Cross born 
Suzanne Crough (1963-2015)
Lindsay Crouse
Ashley Crow born 
Rachel Crow born 
Sheryl Crow born 
Tonya Crowe born 
Macey Cruthird born 
Penelope Cruz born 
Valerie Cruz born 
Melinda Culea born 
Zara Cully (1892-1978)
Molly Culver born 
Erin Cummings 
Whitney Cummings born 
Kaley Cuoco born 
Marianne Curan born 
Piper Curda born 
Kyleigh Curran born 
Ayesha Curry born 
Jane Curtin born 
Jamie Lee Curtis born 
Ann Cusack born 
Joan Cusack born 
Lise Cutter born 
Brandi Cyrus 
Miley Cyrus born 
Noah Cyrus born

D 

Olivia d'Abo born 
Beverly D'Angelo born 
Patti D'Arbanville 
Donna D'Errico born 
Shae D'lyn born 
Arlene Dahl (1925-2021)
Irene Dailey (1920-2008)
E. G. Daily born 
Nadia Dajani born 
Abby Dalton (1932-2020)
Tyne Daly born 
Cathryn Damon (1930-1987)
Claire Danes born 
Shera Danese born 
Brittany Daniel born 
Cynthia Daniel born 
Erin Daniels born 
Sarah E. Daniels born 
Blythe Danner born 
Sybil Danning 
Linda Dano 
Patrika Darbo born 
Kim Darby born 
Jennifer Darling 
Joan Darling born 
Cynthia Darlow born 
Lisa Darr born 
Stacey Dash born 
Kristin Dattilo 
Alexa Davalos
Elyssa Davalos born 
Amy Davidson 
Eileen Davidson
Embeth Davidtz
Shanésia Davis-Williams born 
Ann B. Davis (1926-2014)
Geena Davis born 
Hope Davis born 
Joan Davis (1907-1961)
Josie Davis 
Kristin Davis born 
Paige Davis born 
Suzanne Davis born 
Viola Davis born 
Pam Dawber born 
Portia Dawson born 
Rosario Dawson born 
Roxann Dawson born 
Doris Day (1922-2019)
Nicole de Boer 
Yvonne De Carlo (1922-2007)
Wanda De Jesus born 
Alana de la Garza born 
Madison De La Garza born 
Drea de Matteo born 
Rebecca De Mornay born 
Cote de Pablo born 
Emilie de Ravin born 
Portia de Rossi born 
Melissa De Sousa 
Jo de Winter (1921-2016)
Erin Dean born 
Kristinia DeBarge born 
Rosemary DeCamp (1910-2001)
Ruby Dee (1922-2014)
Sandra Dee (1942-2005)
Ellen DeGeneres born 
Kim Delaney born 
Diane Delano born 
Dana Delany born 
Idalis DeLeón born 
Grey DeLisle born 
Cara DeLizia born 
Heather DeLoach 
Nikki DeLoach born 
Dana DeLorenzo born 
Jude Demorest born 
Lori Beth Denberg born 
Lydie Denier born 
Kat Dennings born 
Gabrielle Dennis 
Sandy Dennis (1937-1992)
Bonnie Dennison born 
Kassie DePaiva born 
Marietta DePrima born 
Bo Derek born 
Laura Dern born 
Emily Deschanel born 
Zooey Deschanel born 
Rosanna DeSoto born 
Natalie Desselle-Reid (1967-2020)
Ryan Destiny born 
Zoey Deutch born 
Patti Deutsch (1943-2017)
Daniella Deutscher born 
Paula Devicq 
Loretta Devine born 
Joyce DeWitt born 
Rosemarie DeWitt born 
Noureen DeWulf 
Susan Dey born 
Caroline Dhavernas born 
Selma Diamond (1920-1985)
Skin Diamond born 
Alyssa Diaz born 
Cameron Diaz born 
Melonie Diaz born 
Jessica DiCicco born 
Angie Dickinson born 
Victoria Dillard born 
Phyllis Diller (1917-2012)
Brooke Dillman born 
Denny Dillon born 
Melinda Dillon born 
Donna Dixon 
Shannen Doherty born 
Elinor Donahue born 
Patricia Donahue (1925-2012)
Ami Dolenz born 
Abby Donnelly born 
Meg Donnelly born 
Amanda Donohoe born 
Elisa Donovan born 
Lauren Lindsey Donzis born 
Ann Doran (1911-2000)
Kristin dos Santos born 
Kaitlin Doubleday born 
Portia Doubleday born 
Donna Douglas (1932-2015)
Illeana Douglas 
Suzzanne Douglas (1957-2021)
Amy Douglass (1902-1980)
Robyn Douglass born 
Lesley-Anne Down born 
Roma Downey born 
Courtnee Draper born 
Jesse Draper born 
Polly Draper born 
Rachel Dratch born 
Fran Drescher born 
Sarah Drew 
Minnie Driver born 
Denise DuBarry (1956-2019)
Ja'Net DuBois 
Heather Dubrow born 
Nicole Dubuc born 
Haylie Duff born 
Hilary Duff born 
Julia Duffy born 
Karen Duffy 
Olympia Dukakis (1931-2021)
Patty Duke (1946-2016)
Faye Dunaway born 
Sandy Duncan born 
Merrin Dungey born 
Lena Dunham born 
Nora Dunn born 
Debbe Dunning born 
Kirsten Dunst born 
Eliza Dushku born 
Nancy Dussault born 
Clea DuVall born 
Shelley Duvall born

E 

Bobbie Eakes born 
Leslie Easterbrook born 
Dina Eastwood born 
Christine Ebersole born 
Megalyn Echikunwoke born 
Lisa Edelstein born 
Barbara Eden born 
Sonya Eddy born 
Hilary Edson born 
Gail Edwards born 
Reign Edwards born 
Stacy Edwards born 
Stephanie Edwards born 
Melissa Claire Egan born 
Susan Egan born 
Nicole Eggert born 
Gretchen Egolf born 
Jill Eikenberry born 
Lisa Eilbacher born 
Carmen Electra born 
Judyanne Elder born 
Erika Eleniak born 
Jenna Elfman born 
Kimberly Elise born 
Jane Elliot born 
Abby Elliott born 
Alecia Elliott born 
Patricia Elliott born 
Aunjanue Ellis born 
Andrea Elson born 
Linda Emond born 
Georgia Engel (1948-2019)
Ellia English born 
Jena Engstrom born 
Joy Enriquez born 
Molly Ephraim born 
Kathryn Erbe born 
Audrey Esparza born 
Tiffany Espensen born 
Jennifer Esposito born 
Susie Essman born 
Christine Estabrook born 
Renée Estevez born 
Scarlett Estevez born 
Andrea Evans born 
Judi Evans born 
Linda Evans born 
Mary Beth Evans born 
Eve born 
Nancy Everhard born 
Angie Everhart born 
Bridget Everett born 
Corinna Everson born 
Briana Evigan born 
Vanessa Lee Evigan born 
Kathy Evison born

F 

Shelley Fabares born 
Nanette Fabray (1920-2018)
Morgan Fairchild born 
Sandy Faison born 
Edie Falco born 
Lola Falana born 
Dakota Fanning born 
Elle Fanning born 
Fantasia born 
Stephanie Faracy born 
Debrah Farentino born 
Anna Faris born 
Frances Farmer (1913-1970)
Taissa Farmiga born 
Diane Farr born 
Felicia Farr born 
Terry Farrell born 
Mia Farrow born 
Lucy Faust born 
Farrah Fawcett (1947-2009)
Meagen Fay 
Melinda O. Fee (1942-2020)
Barbara Feldon born 
Tamara Feldman born 
Lindsay Felton born 
Sherilyn Fenn born 
Fergie born 
Vanessa Ferlito 
Conchata Ferrell (1943-2020)
America Ferrera born 
Peggy Feury (1924-1985)
Tina Fey born 
Chelsea Field 
Sally Field born 
Chip Fields 
Kim Fields born 
Katie Findlay 
Hala Finley born 
Ashley Fink born 
Katie Finneran born 
Jennifer Finnigan born 
Fiona born 
Jenna Fischer born 
Danielle Fishel born 
Carrie Fisher (1956-2016)
Frances Fisher born 
Gail Fisher (1935-2000)
Joely Fisher born 
Tricia Leigh Fisher 
Schuyler Fisk born 
Fannie Flagg born 
Fionnula Flanagan born 
Kate Flannery born 
Susan Flannery born 
Maureen Flannigan born 
Jill Flint born 
Lucy Lee Flippin born 
Calista Flockhart born 
Ann Flood (1932-2022)
Gennifer Flowers born 
Darlanne Fluegel (1953-2017)
Colleen Flynn 
Clare Foley born 
Ellen Foley born 1951
Megan Follows born 
Jane Fonda born 
Lyndsy Fonseca born 
Michelle Forbes born 
Bette Ford born 
Camille Ford born 
Candy Ford 
Clementine Ford born 
Constance Ford (1923-1993)
Faith Ford born 
Ami Foster 
Jodie Foster born 
Kimberly Foster born 
Meg Foster 
Crystal R. Fox born 
Jorja Fox 
Megan Fox born 
Vivica A. Fox born 
Jaimee Foxworth born 
Corinne Foxx born 
Anne Francis (1930-2011)
Connie Francis born 
Genie Francis born 
Melissa Francis born 
Bonnie Franklin (1944-2013)
Mary Frann (1943-1998)
Adrienne Frantz born 
Cassidy Freeman born 
Deena Freeman born 
Jennifer Freeman born 
Kathleen Freeman (1923-2001)
Yvette Freeman born 
Kate French born 
Florida Friebus (1909-1988)
Lauren Frost born 
Lindsay Frost born 
Taylor Fry born 
Soleil Moon Frye born 
Emma Fuhrmann born 
Karen Fukuhara born 
Holly Fulger 
Amanda Fuller born 
Lisa Fuller 
Nikki Fuller born  
Penny Fuller 
Victoria Fuller born 
Wendy Fulton born 
Melissa Fumero born 
Mira Furlan (1955-2021)

G 

June Gable
Eva Gabor
Magda Gabor
Zsa Zsa Gabor
Lady Gaga
Stacy Galina
Megan Gallagher
Gina Gallego
Carla Gallo
Teresa Ganzel
Terri Garber
Paula Garcés
Aimee Garcia
JoAnna Garcia
Jennifer Gareis
Beverly Garland
Jennifer Garner
Julia Garner
Kelli Garner
Peggy Ann Garner
Janeane Garofalo
Teri Garr
Betty Garrett
Joy Garrett
Kathleen Garrett
Maureen Garrett
Susie Garrett
Jennie Garth
Ana Gasteyer
Stephanie Gatschet
Rebecca Gayheart
Cynthia Geary
Ellen Geer
Maggie Geha
Sarah Michelle Gellar
Rhoda Gemignani
Lynda Day George
Marita Geraghty
Gina Gershon
Jami Gertz
Estelle Getty
Alice Ghostley
Cynthia Gibb
Marla Gibbs
Debbie Gibson
Kelli Giddish
Kathie Lee Gifford
Melissa Gilbert
Sara Gilbert
Gwynne Gilford
Ann Gillespie
Anita Gillette
Elizabeth Gillies
Sarah Gilman
Peri Gilpin
Jessalyn Gilsig
Erica Gimpel
Annabeth Gish
Lillian Gish
Adele Givens
Robin Givens
Nikki Glaser
Summer Glau
Lola Glaudini
Joanna Gleason
Mary Pat Gleason
Sarah Glendening
Sharon Gless
Linsey Godfrey
Angela Goethals
Joanna Going
Judy Gold
Missy Gold
Tracey Gold
Whoopi Goldberg
Renée Elise Goldsberry
Reagan Gomez-Preston
Isabella Gomez
Selena Gomez
Meagan Good
Lynda Goodfriend
Deborah Goodrich
Ginnifer Goodwin
Kia Goodwin
Raven Goodwin
Lecy Goranson
Eve Gordon
Ashley Gorrell
YaYa Gosselin
Lauren Gottlieb
Kelly Gould
Sandra Gould
Milena Govich
Elizabeth Gracen
Ilene Graff
Heather Graham
Kat Graham
Lauren Graham
Nancy Lee Grahn
Greer Grammer
Spencer Grammer
Ariana Grande
Beth Grant
Faye Grant
Jennifer Grant
Lee Grant
Shelby Grant
Karen Grassle
Teresa Graves
Erin Gray
Linda Gray
Macy Gray
Sprague Grayden
Jenna Leigh Green
Lindsay and Sidney Greenbush
Ashley Greene
Ellen Greene
Lizzy Greene
Michele Greene
Judy Greer
Robin Greer
Jennifer Grey
Sasha Grey
Pam Grier
Kathy Griffin
Melanie Griffith
Rachel Griffiths
Robyn Griggs
Camryn Grimes
Shenae Grimes
Tammy Grimes
Mary Gross
Leslie Grossman
Naomi Grossman
Camille Guaty
Jackie Guerra
Diane Guerrero
Evelyn Guerrero
Lisa Guerrero
Kimberly Norris Guerrero
Zabryna Guevara
Carla Gugino
Ann Morgan Guilbert
Mamie Gummer
Anna Gunn
Janet Gunn
Annabelle Gurwitch
Elizabeth Gutiérrez
Jasmine Guy
Anne Gwynne
Maggie Gyllenhaal

H 

Olivia Hack born 
Shelley Hack born 
Tiffany Haddish born 
Julie Anne Haddock born 
Molly Hagan born 
Montrose Hagins (1917-2012)
Nikki Hahn born 
Stacy Haiduk born 
Leisha Hailey born 
Alison Haislip born 
Khrystyne Haje born 
Barbara Hale (1922-2017)
Lucy Hale born 
Alaina Reed Hall (1946-2009)
Deidre Hall born 
Irma P. Hall born 
Natalie Hall born 
Regina Hall born 
Ronny Hallin born 
Florence Halop (1923-1986)
Veronica Hamel born 
Carrie Hamilton (1963-2002)
Kim Hamilton (1932-2013)
Kipp Hamilton (1934–1981)
Linda Hamilton born 
LisaGay Hamilton born 
Lois Hamilton (1943-1999)
Lynn Hamilton born 
Barbara Hancock born 
Chelsea Handler born 
Anne Haney (1934-2001)
Daryl Hannah born 
G Hannelius born 
Alyson Hannigan born 
Marcia Gay Harden born 
Melora Hardin born 
Mariska Hargitay born 
Angie Harmon born 
Deborah Harmon born 
Tanisha Harper born 
Tess Harper born 
Valerie Harper (1939-2019)
Laura Harring born 
Barbara Harris (1935-2018)
Cynthia Harris (1934-2021)
Danielle Harris born 
Estelle Harris (1928-2022)
Julie Harris (1925-2013)
Mel Harris born 
Rachael Harris born 
Samantha Harris born 
Jenilee Harrison born 
Linda Harrison born 
Kathryn Harrold born 
Debbie Harry born 
Jackée Harry born 
Cecilia Hart (1948-2016)
Emily Hart born 
Melissa Joan Hart born 
Lindsay Hartley born 
Mariette Hartley born 
Lisa Hartman Black born 
Hayley Hasselhoff born 
Teri Hatcher born 
Amy Hathaway (born 1974)
Anne Hathaway born 
Ronni Hawk born 
Hillary Hawkins
Goldie Hawn born 
Kim Hawthorne born 
Melissa Hayden born 
Billie Hayes (1924-2021)
Susan Seaforth Hayes born 
Kathryn Hays born 
Shari Headley born 
Glenne Headly (1955-2017)
Mehgan Heaney-Grier born 
Amber Heard born 
Marla Heasley born 
Patricia Heaton born 
Anne Heche born 
Gina Hecht born 
Jessica Hecht born 
Eileen Heckart (1919-2001)
Alexandra Hedison born 
Katherine Heigl born 
Amelia Heinle born 
Jayne Heitmeyer born 
Grace Helbig born 
Marg Helgenberger born 
Katherine Helmond (1929-2019)
Mariel Hemingway born 
Shirley Hemphill (1947-1999)
Florence Henderson (1934-2016)
Lauri Hendler born 
Tiffany Hendra born 
Christina Hendricks born 
Elizabeth Hendrickson born 
Elaine Hendrix born 
Leslie Hendrix born 
Marilu Henner born 
Carolyn Hennesy born 
Jill Hennessy born 
Shelley Hennig born 
Linda Kaye Henning born 
Emmaline Henry (1928-1979)
Pamela Hensley born 
Taraji P. Henson born 
Katharine Hepburn (1907-2003)
Rebecca Herbst born 
April Lee Hernández born 
Lilimar Hernandez born 
Kristin Herrera born 
Lynn Herring born 
Jennifer Love Hewitt born 
Catherine Hickland born 
Catherine Hicks born 
Grace Hightower born 
Amy Hill born 
Dana Hill (1964-1996)
Lauryn Hill born 
Kathy Hilton born 
Paris Hilton born 
Aisha Hinds born 
Cheryl Hines born 
Connie Hines (1931-2009)
Tiffany Hines born 
Marin Hinkle born 
Hallee Hirsh born 
Alice Hirson born 
Judith Hoag born 
Kate Hodge born 
Stephanie Hodge born 
Cecil Hoffman born 
Jackie Hoffman born 
Gaby Hoffmann born 
Susanna Hoffs born 
Isabella Hofmann born 
Brooke Hogan born 
Anna Kathryn Holbrook born 
Rebecca Holden born 
Meagan Holder born 
Willa Holland born 
Polly Holliday born 
Laurel Holloman born 
Lauren Holly born 
Celeste Holm (1917-2012)
Jennifer Holmes born 
Katie Holmes born 
Olivia Holt born 
Jan Hooks (1957-2014)
Kaitlin Hopkins born 
Telma Hopkins born 
Monica Horan born 
Anastasia Horne born 
Lena Horne (1917-2010)
Anna Maria Horsford born 
Allison Hossack born 
Lisa Howard born (1926-1965)
Melissa Howard born 
Susan Howard born 
Traylor Howard born 
Beth Howland (1939-2015)
Constance Hsu born 
Kelly Hu born 
Madison Hu born 
Erica Hubbard born 
Janet Hubert born 
Vanessa Hudgens born 
Felicity Huffman born 
Susan Hufford born 
Angee Hughes born 
Sharon Hugueny born 
Finola Hughes born 
Leann Hunley born 
Mary-Margaret Humes born 
Bonnie Hunt born 
Helen Hunt born 
Amy Hunter born 
Holly Hunter born 
Kim Hunter (1922-2002)
Jana Marie Hupp born 
Michelle Hurd born 
Paige Hurd born 
Sherry Hursey born 
Mary Beth Hurt born 
Anjelica Huston born 
Carol Huston born 
Fiona Hutchison born 
Candace Hutson born 
Gunilla Hutton born 
Lauren Hutton born 
Jamie Gray Hyder born 
Diana Hyland (1936-1977)
Sarah Hyland born

I 

Annie Ilonzeh born 
Carrie Ann Inaba born 
Indigo born 
Laura Innes born 
Kathy Ireland born 
Paula Irvine born 
Bindi Irwin born 
Terri Irwin born 
Dana Ivey born 
Judith Ivey born 
Lela Ivey

J 

Dominique Jackson (1960s)
Janet Jackson born 
Kate Jackson born 
LaTanya Richardson Jackson born 
Leeah D. Jackson born 
Mary Jackson (1910-2005)
Paris Jackson born 
Shar Jackson born 
Skai Jackson born 
Gillian Jacobs born 
Francesca James born 
Joyce Jameson (1932-1987)
Allison Janney born 
Erika Jayne born 
Jazzmun born 
Carol Mayo Jenkins born 
Claudia Jennings born 
Dominique Jennings born 
Juanita Jennings born 
Penny Johnson Jerald born 
Geri Jewell born 
Ann Jillian born 
Joyce Jillson born 
Tsianina Joelson born 
Adrienne-Joi Johnson born 
Amy Jo Johnson born 
Anjelah Johnson born 
Anne-Marie Johnson born 
Ariyan A. Johnson born 
Ashley Johnson born 
Beverly Johnson born 
Cherie Johnson born 
Dakota Johnson born 
Georgann Johnson born 
Joanna Johnson born 
Laura Johnson born 
Lynn-Holly Johnson born 
Kristen Johnston born 
JoJo born 
Betsy Jones-Moreland (1930-2006)
Ashley Jones born 
Carolyn Jones (1930-1983)
Coco Jones born 
Dot-Marie Jones born 
January Jones born 
Jill Marie Jones born 
Leslie Jones born 
Rashida Jones born 
Renée Jones born 
Shirley Jones born 
Ta'Rhonda Jones born 
Tamala Jones born 
Toccara Jones born 
Kathryn Joosten (1939-2012)
Alexis Jordan born 
Bobbi Jordan born 
Claudia Jordan born 
Lydia Jordan born 
Olivia Jordan born 
Sharon Jordan born 
Jackie Joseph born 
Milla Jovovich born 
Malese Jow born 
Elaine Joyce born 
Ella Joyce born 
Ashley Judd born 
Katherine Justice born 
Victoria Justice born

K 

Jane Kaczmarek
Madeline Kahn
Patricia Kalember
Mindy Kaling
Melina Kanakaredes
Carol Kane
Chelsea Kane
Shannon Kane
Mitzi Kapture
Kim Kardashian
Alexandria Karlsen
Jean Kasem
Stana Katic
Markella Kavenagh
Julie Kavner
Caren Kaye
Staci Keanan
Diane Keaton
Mary Jo Keenen
Stacy Keibler
Mary Page Keller
Melissa Keller
Rachel Keller
Sally Kellerman
Susan Kellermann
Sheila Kelley
Jean Louisa Kelly
Kitty Kelly
Lisa Robin Kelly
Minka Kelly
Moira Kelly
Patsy Kelly
Paula Kelly
Rae'Ven Larrymore Kelly
Linda Kelsey
Ellie Kemper
Anna Kendrick
Jessica Parker Kennedy
Mimi Kennedy
Shannon Kenny
Leila Kenzle
Joanna Kerns
Sandra Kerns
Elizabeth Kerr
T'Keyah Crystal Keymah
Alicia Keys
Simbi Khali
Christel Khalil
Margot Kidder
Kaleena Kiff
Wendy Kilbourne
Tara Killian
Aja Naomi King
Carole King
Cleo King
Kent Masters King
Mabel King
Regina King
Alex Kingston
Kathleen Kinmont
Kathy Kinney
Angela Kinsey
Sally Kirkland
Tawny Kitaen
Eartha Kitt
Hayley Kiyoko
Pat Klous
Heidi Klum
Keshia Knight Pulliam
Gladys Knight
Christy Knowings
Shanica Knowles
Gail Kobe
Ava Kolker
Karen Kopins
Jenn Korbee
Mia Korf
Alla Korot
Liza Koshy
Lauren Koslow
Harley Jane Kozak
Jane Krakowski
Clare Kramer
Jana Kramer
Stepfanie Kramer
Zoë Kravitz
Alice Krige
Ilene Kristen
Suzanne Krull
Lisa Kudrow
Nancy Kulp
Mila Kunis
Swoosie Kurtz
Katy Kurtzman
Jennie Kwan
Nancy Kwan

L 

Gina La Piana
Alison La Placa
Cheryl Ladd
Diane Ladd
Jordan Ladd
Margaret Ladd
Bonnie-Jill Laflin
Lady Gaga
Christine Lahti
Elizabeth Lail
Leah Lail
Ricki Lake
Veronica Lake
Christine Lakin
Lalaine
Shayne Lamas
Lana
Amber Lancaster
Sarah Lancaster
Audrey Landers
Judy Landers
Jennifer Landon
Leslie Landon
Sofia Landon Geier
Ali Landry
Valerie Landsburg
Briana Lane
Diane Lane
Lauren Lane
Katherine Kelly Lang
Hope Lange
Jessica Lange
Heather Langenkamp
A. J. Langer
Brooke Langton
Kim Lankford
Angela Lansbury
Liza Lapira
Linda Larkin
Brie Larson
Jill Larson
Ali Larter
Eva LaRue
Louise Lasser
Louise Latham
Sanaa Lathan
Queen Latifah
Cyndi Lauper
Tammy Lauren
Piper Laurie
Linda Lavin
Reneé Lawless
Carol Lawrence
Jennifer Lawrence
Sharon Lawrence
Vicki Lawrence
Bianca Lawson
Maggie Lawson
Ava Lazar
Sabrina Le Beauf
Jessica Leccia
Nicole Leach
Cloris Leachman
NeNe Leakes
Sharon Leal
Michael Learned
Brianne Leary
Brandy Ledford
Alexondra Lee
Charmin Lee
Michele Lee
Peyton Elizabeth Lee
Raquel Lee
Sheryl Lee
Jane Leeves
Kristin Lehman
Hudson Leick
Carol Leifer
Chyler Leigh
Janet Leigh
Jennifer Jason Leigh
Amanda Leighton
Laura Leighton
Heidi Lenhart
Rosetta LeNoire
Bethany Joy Lenz
Kay Lenz
Melissa Leo
Adrianne León
Téa Leoni
Clea Lewis
Dawnn Lewis
Jazsmin Lewis
Jenifer Lewis
Jenny Lewis
Judy Lewis
Juliette Lewis
Kimrie Lewis
Sagan Lewis
Toni Lewis
Vicki Lewis
Jennifer Lien
Tina Lifford
Judith Light
Lar Park-Lincoln
Natalie Alyn Lind
Kate Linder
Audra Lindley
Laura Linney
Joanne Linville
Tara Lipinski
Peggy Lipton
Peyton List (actress, born 1986)
Peyton List (actress, born 1998)
Zoe Lister-Jones
Beth Littleford
Lucy Liu
Blake Lively
Robyn Lively
Natalia Livingston
Kari Lizer
Kathleen Lloyd
Sabrina Lloyd
Amy Locane
Lisa LoCicero
Tembi Locke
Anne Lockhart
June Lockhart
Heather Locklear
Lindsay Lohan
Alison Lohman
Kristanna Loken
Julie London
Lauren London
Jodi Long
Nia Long
Shelley Long
Eva Longoria
Jennifer Lopez
Gloria Loring
Lisa Loring
Lynn Loring
Lori Loughlin
Julia Louis-Dreyfus
Tina Louise
Billie Lourd
Demi Lovato
Deirdre Lovejoy
Patrice Lovely
Carey Lowell
Marcella Lowery
Katie Lowes
Myrna Loy
Florencia Lozano
Jessica Lucas
Susan Lucci
Dorothy Lucey
LeToya Luckett
Deanna Lund
Jessica Lundy
Jamie Luner
Ida Lupino
Patti LuPone
Masiela Lusha
Dorothy Lyman
Jane Lynch
Carol Lynley
Janice Lynde
Meredith Scott Lynn
Tanisha Lynn
Judy Lynne
Melanie Lynskey
Natasha Lyonne

M 

Sunny Mabrey
Jes Macallan
Ali MacGraw
Justina Machado
Allison Mack
Janet MacLachlan
Shirley MacLaine
Elizabeth MacRae
Meredith MacRae
Sheila MacRae
Amy Madigan
Bailee Madison
Mikey Madison
Virginia Madsen
Deedee Magno Hall
Ann Magnuson
Valerie Mahaffey
Mallory James Mahoney
Kayla Maisonet
Beth Maitland
Tina Majorino
Wendy Makkena
Wendie Malick
Jena Malone
Nancy Malone
Zosia Mamet
Melissa Manchester
Camryn Manheim
Sunita Mani
Aarti Mann
Aimee Mann
Leslie Mann
Dinah Manoff
Jayne Mansfield
Sally Mansfield
Marla Maples
Kate Mara
Mary Mara
Rooney Mara
Laura Marano
Vanessa Marano
Stephanie March
Nancy Marchand
Vanessa Marcil
Eva Marcille
Margo
Janet Margolin
Julianna Margulies
Constance Marie
Ada Maris
Kelli Maroney
McKayla Maroney
Linda Marsh
Paula Marshall
Penny Marshall
Trudy Marshall
Vanessa Marshall
Martika
Andrea Martin
Anne-Marie Martin
Deana Martin
Helen Martin
Kellie Martin
Lori Martin
Madeleine Martin
Marsai Martin
Meaghan Martin
Millicent Martin
Nan Martin
Nikki Martin
Pamela Sue Martin
Natalie Martinez
Elizabeth Marvel
Chase Masterson
Mary Stuart Masterson
Mary Elizabeth Mastrantonio
Heather Matarazzo
Debbie Matenopoulos
Elizabeth Mathis
Samantha Mathis
Matisse
Marlee Matlin
DeLane Matthews
Robin Mattson
Kimberly Matula
Abigail Mavity
Jenny Maxwell
Lauren Mayhew
Melanie Mayron
Eaddy Mays
Jayma Mays
Tristin Mays
Debi Mazar
Heather McAdam
Diane McBain
Harlee McBride
Melissa McBride
Frances Lee McCain
Mitzi McCall
Shalane McCall
Christine Elise McCarthy
Jenny McCarthy
Melissa McCarthy
Kelli McCarty
Constance McCashin
Peggy McCay
Cady McClain
China Anne McClain
Sierra McClain
Rue McClanahan
Kathleen McClellan
Judith McConnell
AnnaLynne McCord
Mary McCormack
Patty McCormack
Carolyn McCormick
Maureen McCormick
Sierra McCormick
LisaRaye McCoy
Julie McCullough
Kimberly McCullough
Jennette McCurdy
Hattie McDaniel
Audra McDonald
Mary McDonnell
Eileen McDonough
Mary Elizabeth McDonough
Frances McDormand
Reba McEntire
Gates McFadden
Trina McGee
Vonetta McGee
Kelly McGillis
Elizabeth McGovern
Rose McGowan
Melinda McGraw
Maeve McGuire
Danica McKellar
Alex McKenna
Lindsey McKeon
Nancy McKeon
Kate McKinnon
Beverlee McKinsey
Elizabeth McLaughlin
Emily McLaughlin
Madison McLaughlin
Zoe McLellan
Wendi McLendon-Covey
Jenna McMahon
Michaela McManus
Barbara McNair
Heather McNair
Kate McNeil
Kristy McNichol
Julie McNiven
Patricia McNulty
Katharine McPhee
Patricia McPherson
Megan McTavish
Eve McVeagh
Caroline McWilliams
Audrey Meadows
Jayne Meadows
Kristen Meadows
Anne Meara
Barbara Meek
Theresa Meeker
Leighton Meester
Meghan, Duchess of Sussex
Daniela Melchior
Kate Melton
Camila Mendes
Eva Mendes
Bridgit Mendler
Maria Menounos
Idina Menzel
Heather Menzies
Marian Mercer
Lee Meriwether
Una Merkel
S. Epatha Merkerson
Theresa Merritt
Tammy Faye Messner
Debra Messing
Laurie Metcalf
Chrissy Metz
Rebecca Metz
Caitlin EJ Meyer
Dina Meyer
Ari Meyers
Lucia Micarelli
Justine Miceli
Jeanna Michaels
Kari Michaelsen
AJ Michalka
Aly Michalka
Lea Michele
Michael Michele
Cathryn Michon
Kate Micucci
Midajah
Tracy Middendorf
Vanessa Middleton
Bette Midler
Amber Midthunder
Mikaila
Alyssa Milano
Elaine Miles
Joanna Miles
Christa Miller
Cymphonique Miller
Lara Jill Miller
Penelope Ann Miller
Sienna Miller
Valarie Rae Miller
Alley Mills
Donna Mills
Hayley Mills
Juliet Mills
Shirley Mills
Jane Milmore
Jennifer Milmore
Candi Milo
Sofia Milos
Yvette Mimieux
Jan Miner
Kate Miner
Rachel Miner
Liza Minnelli
Kathryn Minner
Alicia Minshew
Kelly Jo Minter
MioSoty
Irene Miracle
Aeriél Miranda
Beverley Mitchell
Elizabeth Mitchell
Julia Pace Mitchell
Maia Mitchell
Shay Mitchell
Katy Mixon
Kim Miyori
Diane Mizota
Mo'Nique
Shanna Moakler
Mary Ann Mobley
Katherine Moennig
Gretchen Mol
Janel Moloney
Taylor Momsen
Kelly Monaco
Marjorie Monaghan
Michelle Monaghan
Daniella Monet
Wendy Moniz
Meredith Monroe
Sumalee Montano
Barbara Montgomery
Elizabeth Montgomery
Julia Montgomery
Poppy Montgomery
Lynne Moody
Debra Mooney
Christina Moore
Demi Moore
Julianne Moore
Kenya Moore
Mandy Moore
Mary Tyler Moore
Melba Moore
Agnes Moorehead
Erin Moran
Elizabeth Morehead
Belita Moreno
Rita Moreno
Cindy Morgan
Debbi Morgan
Jaye P. Morgan
Mishael Morgan
Cathy Moriarty
Alanis Morissette
Priscilla Morrill
Heather Morris
Jessica Morris
Kathryn Morris
Sarah Jane Morris
Jennifer Morrison
Shelley Morrison
Karen Morrow
Liza Morrow
Mari Morrow
Patricia Morrow
Tinsley Mortimer
Karla Mosley
Elisabeth Moss
Laura Moss
Paige Moss
Rachel Moss
Bess Motta
Tamera Mowry
Tia Mowry
Bridget Moynahan
Diana Muldaur
Kate Mulgrew
Megan Mullally
Allison Munn
Olivia Munn
Julia Murney
Brittany Murphy
Diane Murphy
Donna Murphy
Erin Murphy
Mary Murphy
Morgan Murphy
Jaime Murray

N 

Kathy Najimy born 
Niecy Nash born 
Naturi Naughton born 
Diane Neal born 
Elise Neal born 
Patricia Neal (1926-2010)
Connie Needham born 
Tracey Needham born 
Stacey Nelkin born 
Kate Nelligan
Harriet Nelson (1909-1994)
Tracy Nelson born 
Lois Nettleton (1927-2008)
Bebe Neuwirth born 
Julie Newmar born 
Irene Ng born 
Denise Nicholas born 
Nichelle Nichols (1932-2022)
Rachel Nichols born 
Julianne Nicholson born 
Lily Nicksay born 
Danielle Nicolet born 
Barbara Niven born 
Cynthia Nixon born 
Stephanie Niznik born 
Minaei Noji born 
Gena Lee Nolin born 
Kathleen Noone born 
Christopher Norris born 
Heather North born 
Sheree North (1932-2005)
Judy Norton born 
Brandy Norwood born

O 

Randi Oakes born 
Jacqueline Obradors born 
Emily O'Brien born 
Laurie O'Brien born 
Glynnis O'Connor born 
Renee O'Connor born 
Jennifer O'Dell born 
Rosie O'Donnell born 
Brittany O'Grady born 
Gail O'Grady born 
Lani O'Grady born 
Sandra Oh born 
Catherine O'Hara born 
Jenny O'Hara born 
Jodi Lyn O'Keefe born 
Tricia O'Kelley born 
Enuka Okuma born 
Larisa Oleynik born 
Susan Oliver (1932-1990)
Ashley Olsen born 
Elizabeth Olsen born 
Mary-Kate Olsen born 
Susan Olsen born 
Kaitlin Olson born 
Tatum O'Neal born 
Lupe Ontiveros (1942-2012)
Melissa Ordway born 
Jenna Ortega born 
Ana Ortiz born 
Jaina Lee Ortiz born 
Valery Ortiz born 
Emily Osment born 
Marie Osmond born 
Cheri Oteri born 
Annette O'Toole born 
Park Overall born 
Beverley Owen born 
Catherine Oxenberg born

P 

Judy Pace
Joanna Pacitti
Kelly Packard
Mikki Padilla
LaWanda Page
Nicole Paggi
Janis Paige
Taylour Paige
Paigion
Adrianne Palicki
Betsy Palmer
Keke Palmer
Gwyneth Paltrow
Danielle Panabaker
Kay Panabaker
Hayden Panettiere
Grace Park
Linda Park
Andrea Parker
Mary-Louise Parker
Nicole Parker
Nicole Ari Parker
Paula Jai Parker
Sarah Jessica Parker
Dian Parkinson
Megan Parlen
Lana Parrilla
Teyonah Parris
Janel Parrish
Julie Parrish
Leslie Parrish
Azure Parsons
Estelle Parsons
Karyn Parsons
Dolly Parton
Tonye Patano
Candice Patton
Paula Patton
Alexandra Paul
Sarah Paulson
Sara Paxton
Jo Marie Payton
Nasim Pedrad
Aubrey Peeples
Nia Peeples
Amanda Peet
Mary Beth Peil
Ashley Peldon
Courtney Peldon
Nicola Peltz
Elizabeth Peña
Piper Perabo
Anna Maria Perez de Tagle
Clara Perez
Rosie Perez
Daniella Perkins
Elizabeth Perkins
Rhea Perlman
Pauley Perrette
Netfa Perry
Lisa Jane Persky
Donna Pescow
Melissa Peterman
Bernadette Peters
Cassandra Peterson
Valarie Pettiford
Madison Pettis
Lori Petty
Jade Pettyjohn
Penny Peyser
Dedee Pfeiffer
Michelle Pfeiffer
Jo Ann Pflug
Busy Philipps
Chynna Phillips
Julianne Phillips
Mackenzie Phillips
Michelle Phillips
Peg Phillips
Wendy Phillips
Liberty Phoenix
Rain Phoenix
Summer Phoenix
Alexandra Picatto
Cindy Pickett
Christina Pickles
Julie Piekarski
Amy Pietz
Alison Pill
Jada Pinkett Smith
Tonya Pinkins
Dana Plato
Aubrey Plaza
Suzanne Pleshette
Martha Plimpton
Eve Plumb
Amanda Plummer
Cathy Podewell
Amy Poehler
Priscilla Pointer
Sydney Tamiia Poitier
Anneliese van der Pol
Cheryl Pollak
Teri Polo
Scarlett Pomers
Ellen Pompeo
Natalie Portman
Parker Posey
Markie Post
Carol Potter
Lauren Potter
Monica Potter
Annie Potts
CCH Pounder
Alexandra Powers
Stefanie Powers
Susan Powter
Deborah Pratt
Keri Lynn Pratt
Kyla Pratt
Victoria Pratt
Ann Prentiss
Paula Prentiss
Laura Prepon
Priscilla Presley
Jaime Pressly
Sally Pressman
Carrie Preston
Kelly Preston
Lindsay Price
Megyn Price
Molly Price
Pat Priest
Faith Prince
Victoria Principal
Joan Pringle
Emily Procter
Jessica Prunell
Rain Pryor
Dorothy Provine
Devyn Puett
Haley Pullos
Lucy Punch
Lee Purcell
Linda Purl

Q 
Maggie Q born 
Kathleen Quinlan born  
Martha Quinn born  
Molly Quinn born

R 

Lily Rabe
Cassidy Rae
Charlotte Rae
Frances Rafferty
Deborah Raffin
Cristina Raines
Natalie Raitano
Mary Lynn Rajskub
Sheryl Lee Ralph
Leven Rambin
Dania Ramirez
Sara Ramirez
Anne Ramsay
Lexi Randall
Betsy Randle
Theresa Randle
Claire Rankin
Phylicia Rashad
Melissa Rauch
Raven-Symoné
Elsa Raven
Kim Raver
Connie Ray
Ola Ray
Tanika Ray
Jazz Raycole
Peggy Rea
Elizabeth Reaser
Diona Reasonover
Rebell
Marge Redmond
Crystal Reed
Donna Reed
Jillian Rose Reed
Pamela Reed
Shanna Reed
Tracy Reed
Rachel Reenstra
Della Reese
Autumn Reeser
Dana Reeve
Melissa Reeves
Perrey Reeves
Bridget Regan
Daphne Maxwell Reid
Frances Reid
Storm Reid
Tara Reid
Lee Remick
Leah Remini
Retta
Gloria Reuben
Alisa Reyes
Judy Reyes
Debbie Reynolds
Sophie Reynolds
Barbara Rhoades
Erica Rhodes
Jennifer Rhodes
Kim Rhodes
Madlyn Rhue
Marissa Ribisi
Gigi Rice
Ariana Richards
Beah Richards
Denise Richards
Kyle Richards
Joely Richardson
Patricia Richardson
Salli Richardson
Susan Richardson
Nicole Richie
Ashley Rickards
Stefanie Ridel
Lisa Rieffel
Eden Riegel
Cathy Rigby
Diana Rigg
Amber Riley
Jeannine Riley
Robin Riker
Molly Ringwald
Lisa Rinna
Kelly Ripa
Krysten Ritter
Thelma Ritter
Diana Maria Riva
Naya Rivera
Joan Rivers
AnnaSophia Robb
Jacqueline and Joyce Robbins
Ashley Roberts
Doris Roberts
Emma Roberts
Francesca P. Roberts
Julia Roberts
Tanya Roberts
Antoinette Robertson
Britt Robertson
Kathleen Robertson
Louise Robey
Wendy Robie
Laila Robins
Holly Robinson Peete
Wendy Raquel Robinson
Kali Rocha
Tudi Roche
Lela Rochon
Blossom Rock
Marcia Rodd
Olivia Rodrigo
Gina Rodriguez
Krysta Rodriguez
Michelle Rodriguez
Raini Rodriguez
Jane A. Rogers
Kasey Rogers
Kylie Rogers
Mimi Rogers
Suzanne Rogers
Elisabeth Röhm
Roxie Roker
Rose Rollins
Christy Carlson Romano
Stephanie Romanov
Rebecca Romijn
Linda Ronstadt
Amelia Rose
Chaley Rose
Emily Rose
Andrea Rosen
Mackenzie Rosman
Charlotte Ross
Diana Ross
Marion Ross
Tracee Ellis Ross
Victoria Rowell
Kelly Rowland
Gena Rowlands
Daniela Ruah
Jennifer Rubin
Zelda Rubinstein
Emily Rudd
Sara Rue
Mercedes Ruehl
Debra Jo Rupp
Betsy Russell
Keri Russell
Kimberly Russell
Deanna Russo
Rene Russo
Kelly Rutherford
Susan Ruttan
Amy Ryan
Debby Ryan
Fran Ryan
Jeri Ryan
Joan Ryan
Lisa Dean Ryan
Marisa Ryan
Meg Ryan
Roz Ryan
Lisa Ryder
Winona Ryder
Marcy Rylan

S 

Sable
Katee Sackhoff
Jean Sagal
Katey Sagal
Liz Sagal
Halston Sage
Marlene Sai
Susan Saint James
Eva Marie Saint
Theresa Saldana
Zoe Saldana
Dahlia Salem
Jennifer Salt
Emma Samms
Philece Sampler
Holly Sampson
Skyler Samuels
Laura San Giacomo
Cyndee San Luis
Ashlyn Sanchez
Caitlin Sanchez
Jessica Sanchez
Kiele Sanchez
Roselyn Sánchez
Shauna Sand
Ajai Sanders
Erin Sanders
Summer Sanders
Debra Sandlund
Olivia Sandoval
Diana Sands
Renee Sands
Tara Sands
Isabel Sanford
Saundra Santiago
Tessie Santiago
Bianca Santos
Cristina Saralegui
Susan Sarandon
Brytni Sarpy
Lori Saunders
Andrea Savage
Jennifer Savidge
Ariana Savalas
Danielle Savre
Morgan Saylor
Allison Scagliotti
Susan Scannell
Michele Scarabelli
Diana Scarwid
Kristen Schaal
Wendy Schaal
Felice Schachter
Rebecca Schaeffer
Tarah Lynne Schaeffer
Natalie Schafer
Anne Schedeen
Mary Scheer
Taylor Schilling
Bitty Schram
Carly Schroeder
Amanda Schull
Rebecca Schull
Emily Schulman
Amy Schumer
Annabella Sciorra
Tracy Scoggins
Caterina Scorsone
Amiyah Scott
Ashley Scott
Bonnie Scott
Brenda Scott
Debralee Scott
Jean Bruce Scott
Jill Scott
Kathryn Leigh Scott
Martha Scott
Melody Thomas Scott
Pippa Scott
Stefanie Scott
Tasha Scott
Veronica Scott
Jocelyn Seagrave
Amy Sedaris
Kyra Sedgwick
Paige Segal
Selena
Connie Sellecca
Suzanne Sena
Seryah
Joan Severance
Chloë Sevigny
Sicily Sewell
Amanda Seyfried
Jane Seymour
Stephanie Seymour
Sarah Shahi
Yara Shahidi
Colleen Shannon
Molly Shannon
Keesha Sharp
Helen Shaver
China Shavers
Fiona Shaw
Charity Shea
Ally Sheedy
Deborah Shelton
Kiki Shepard
Vonda Shepard
Cybill Shepherd
Sherri Shepherd
Eden Sher
Nicollette Sheridan
Hazel Shermet
Brooke Shields
Kathy Shower
Elisabeth Shue
Jane Sibbett
Gabourey Sidibe
Denny Siegel
Jamie-Lynn Sigler
Cynthia Sikes Yorkin
Karen Sillas
Leslie Silva
Laura Silverman
Sarah Silverman
Cathy Silvers
Alicia Silverstone
Jean Simmons
Kimora Lee Simmons
Lili Simmons
Jazmyn Simon
Hannah Simone
Ashlee Simpson
Jessica Simpson
Molly Sims
Sadie Sink
Madge Sinclair
Mary Sinclair
Lori Singer
Marina Sirtis
Jennifer Sky
Ione Skye
Erika Slezak
Tina Sloan
Lindsay Sloane
Anna Slotky
Amy Smart
Jean Smart
Tava Smiley
Anna Deavere Smith
Anna Nicole Smith
Brooke Smith
Hillary B. Smith
Jaclyn Smith
Jada Pinkett Smith
Kellita Smith
Martha Smith
Phyllis Smith
Shawnee Smith
Shelley Smith
Tasha Smith
Toukie Smith
Willow Smith
Yeardley Smith
Jan Smithers
Jurnee Smollett
Cobie Smulders
Carrie Snodgress
Brittany Snow
Liza Snyder
Leelee Sobieski
Rena Sofer
Sonja Sohn
Marla Sokoloff
Brett Somers
Suzanne Somers
Bonnie Somerville
Phyllis Somerville
Julie Sommars
Brenda Song
Louise Sorel
Nancy Sorel
Arleen Sorkin
Mira Sorvino
Ann Sothern
Dana Sparks
Jordin Sparks
Britney Spears
Jamie Lynn Spears
Tori Spelling
Abigail Spencer
Danielle Spencer
Laura Spencer
Octavia Spencer
Wendie Jo Sperber
Jordana Spiro
Spivy
June Squibb
Gina St. John
Jill St. John
Michelle Stafford
Nancy Stafford
Lisa Stahl
Darby Stanchfield
Bern Nadette Stanis
Florence Stanley
Barbara Stanwyck
Jean Stapleton
Maureen Stapleton
Chrishell Stause
Amy Steel
Karen Steele
Jessica Steen
Nancy Steen
Mary Steenburgen
Gwen Stefani
Hailee Steinfeld
Amandla Stenberg
Stephanie
Mindy Sterling
Tisha Sterling
Beth Ostrosky Stern
Dawn Stern
Frances Sternhagen
Amber Stevens West
Connie Stevens
Katie Stevens
Kaye Stevens
Naomi Stevens
Pat Stevens
Rise Stevens
Stella Stevens
Cynthia Stevenson
Alana Stewart
Julia Stiles
Barbara Stock
Trinitee Stokes
Angie Stone
Emma Stone
Gabrielle Stone
Jennifer Stone
Kirsten Storms
Madeleine Stowe
Sal Stowers
Susan Strasberg
Robin Strasser
Karen Strassman
Marcia Strassman
Meryl Streep
Gail Strickland
KaDee Strickland
Sherry Stringfield
Brenda Strong
Cecily Strong
Tara Strong
Sally Struthers
Anna Stuart
Barbara Stuart
Mary Stuart
Maxine Stuart
Shannon Sturges
Brooklyn Sudano
Kelly Sullivan
Nancy Sullivan
Nicole Sullivan
Susan Sullivan
Cree Summer
Tika Sumpter
Caroline Sunshine
Kristine Sutherland
Carol Sutton
Hilary Swank
Gloria Swanson
Jackie Swanson
Jandi Swanson
Kristy Swanson
Melinda Sward
Alison Sweeney
Julia Sweeney
Sydney Sweeney
Rachel Sweet
Madylin Sweeten
Jodie Sweetin
Inga Swenson
Taylor Swift
Loretta Swit
Brenda Sykes
Wanda Sykes

T 

Rita Taggart
Nita Talbot
Patricia Tallman
Amber Tamblyn
Barbara Tarbuck
Katelyn Tarver
Jill Tasker
Catherine Tate
 Sharon Tate
Leigh Taylor-Young
Christine Taylor
Clarice Taylor
Elizabeth Taylor
Holland Taylor
Jennifer Taylor
Renée Taylor
Tamara Taylor
Aimee Teegarden
Shirley Temple
Amanda Tepe
Taryn Terrell
Charlize Theron
Lauren Tewes
Tia Texada
Brynn Thayer
Brooke Theiss
Jodi Thelen
Tiffani Thiessen
Lynne Thigpen
Melody Thomas Scott
Betty Thomas
Heather Thomas
Marlo Thomas
Michelle Thomas
Andrea Thompson
Lea Thompson
Linda Thompson
Sada Thompson
Scottie Thompson
Susanna Thompson
Tessa Thompson
Tracie Thoms
Courtney Thorne-Smith
Bella Thorne
Callie Thorne
Tiffany Thornton
Rachel Ticotin
Maura Tierney
Pam Tillis
Jennifer Tilly
Meg Tilly
Charlene Tilton
Tinashe
Ashley Tisdale
Jennifer Tisdale
Brianne Tju
Haley Tju
Becca Tobin
Jacqueline Toboni
Beverly Todd
Hallie Todd
Gina Tognoni
Berlinda Tolbert
Judy Toll
Allison Tolman
Amy Tolsky
Susan Tolsky
Heather Tom
Lauren Tom
Nicholle Tom
Concetta Tomei
Marisa Tomei
Tamlyn Tomita
Lily Tomlin
LeShay Tomlinson
Eve Torres
Gina Torres
Beth Toussaint
Lorraine Toussaint
Constance Towers
Jill Townsend
Tammy Townsend
Michelle Trachtenberg
Mary Ellen Trainor
Thalia Tran
Thuy Trang
Nancy Travis
Stacey Travis
Ellen Travolta
Margaret Travolta
Terri Treas
Mary Treen
Anne Tremko
Paula Trickey
Jeanne Tripplehorn
Rachel True
Hillary Tuck
Jessica Tuck
Deborah Tucker
Lisa Tucker
Sophie Tucker
Gabrielle Tuite
Bitsie Tulloch
Tamara Tunie
Robin Tunney
Paige Turco
Ann Turkel
Bree Turner
Janine Turner
Karri Turner
Kathleen Turner
Lana Turner
Ruby Rose Turner
Tina Turner
Aida Turturro
Shannon Tweed
Aisha Tyler
Liv Tyler
Hunter Tylo
Cicely Tyson

U 
Alanna Ubach born 
Leslie Uggams born 
Tracey Ullman born 
Kim Johnston Ulrich born 
Brittany Underwood born 
Carrie Underwood born 
Gabrielle Union born 
Kate Upton born 
Jenna Ushkowitz born

V 

Brenda Vaccaro born 
Sigrid Valdis (1935-2007)
Nancy Valen born 
Brooke Valentine born 
Cindy Valentine born 
Grace Valentine (1884-1964)
Karen Valentine born 
Dana Valery born 
Joan Van Ark born 
Joyce Van Patten born 
Deborah Van Valkenburgh born 
Dorothy Van (1928-2002)
Vivian Vance (1909-1979)
Kirsten Vangsness born  
Denise Vasi born 
Liz Vassey born 
Sofia Vassilieva born 
Countess Vaughn born 
Terri J. Vaughn born 
Zelina Vega born 
Lauren Vélez born 
Diane Venora born 
Elena Verdugo (1925-2017)
Sofia Vergara born 
Kate Vernon born 
Christina Vidal born 
Lisa Vidal born 
Tanya Vidal
Thea Vidale born 
Tracy Vilar born 
Nana Visitor born 
Vitamin C born 
Darlene Vogel born 
Rita Volk born 
Nedra Volz (1908-2003)
Jenna von Oÿ born 
Lark Voorhies born

W 

Caitlin Wachs
Jill Wagner
Kristina Wagner
Lindsay Wagner
Natasha Gregson Wagner
Janet Waldo
Suzanne Waldron
Sonya Walger
Ally Walker
Arnetia Walker
Bree Walker
Dreama Walker
Marcy Walker
Nancy Walker
Tonja Walker
Dee Wallace
Marcia Wallace
Kate Walsh
Maiara Walsh
Jessica Walter
Lisa Ann Walter
Laurie Walters
Melora Walters
Susan Walters
Peggy Walton-Walker
Jess Walton
Maitland Ward
Megan Ward
Rachel Ward
Sela Ward
Marsha Warfield
Estella Warren
Karle Warren
Kiersten Warren
Lesley Ann Warren
Kerry Washington
Carlene Watkins
Michaela Watkins
Cynthia Watros
Vernee Watson-Johnson
Rolonda Watts
Kim Wayans
Shawn Weatherly
Patty Weaver
Sigourney Weaver
Bresha Webb
Chloe Webb
Haley Webb
Jane Webb
Lucy Webb
Veronica Webb
Ann Wedgeworth
Lauren Weedman
Liza Weil
Malina Weissman
Rachel Weisz
Raquel Welch
Olivia Scott Welch
Tuesday Weld
Dawn Wells
Tracy Wells
Ming-Na Wen
Ali Wentworth
Maura West
Natalie West
Celia Weston
Patricia Wettig
Suzanne Whang
Dana Wheeler-Nicholson
Ellen Wheeler
Maggie Wheeler
Jill Whelan
Lisa Whelchel
Betty White
Karen Malina White
Michole Briana White
Lynn Whitfield
Kym Whitley
Mae Whitman
Grace Lee Whitney
Emily Wickersham
Mary Wickes
Kathleen Widdoes
Dianne Wiest
Laura Slade Wiggins
Kristen Wiig
Collin Wilcox
Lisa Wilcox
Abby Wilde
Olivia Wilde
Kathleen Wilhoite
Allison Williams
Ashley Williams
Bergen Williams
Cara Williams
Caroline Williams
Cindy Williams
Jessica White
JoBeth Williams
Kelli Williams
Kellie Shanygne Williams
Kiely Williams
Kimberly Williams-Paisley
Lori Williams
Malinda Williams
Melissa L. Williams
Michelle Williams
Michelle Williams (singer)
Nafessa Williams
Natashia Williams
Porsha Williams
Tonya Williams
Vanessa A. Williams
Vanessa L. Williams
Wendy Williams
Bree Williamson
Alicia Leigh Willis
Katherine Willis
Rumer Willis
Beverly Wills
Sheila Wills
Casey Wilson
Chandra Wilson
Debra Wilson
Mara Wilson
Mary Louise Wilson
Melanie Wilson
Nancy Wilson
Peta Wilson
Rita Wilson
Sheree J. Wilson
Yvette Wilson
Deborah Joy Winans
Camille Winbush
Amy Winfrey
Oprah Winfrey
Leslie Wing
Debra Winger
Mare Winningham
Katheryn Winnick
Marissa Jaret Winokur
Mary Elizabeth Winstead
Hattie Winston
Ariel Winter
Reese Witherspoon
Alicia Witt
Roz Witt
Karen Witter
Meg Wittner
Annie Wood
Bebe Wood
Evan Rachel Wood
Jacqueline MacInnes Wood
Lana Wood
Natalie Wood
Peggy Wood
Alfre Woodard
Charlayne Woodard
Pat Woodell
Lauren Woodland
Shailene Woodley
Barbara Alyn Woods
Nan Woods
Renn Woods
Joanne Woodward
Shannon Woodward
Jo Anne Worley
Aloma Wright
Laura Wright
N'Bushe Wright
Robin Wright
Becky Wu
Constance Wu
Kristy Wu
Lisa Wu
Kari Wuhrer
Jane Wyatt
Sofia Wylie
Meg Wyllie
Jane Wyman
Victoria Wyndham
Amanda Wyss

Y 

Claire Yarlett born 
Celeste Yarnall (1944-2018)
Amy Yasbeck born 
Breanna Yde born 
Trisha Yearwood born 
Ashlynn Yennie born 
Michelle Yeoh born 
Erica Yohn (1928-2019)
Francine York (1938-2017)
Kathleen York
Morgan York born 
Tina Yothers born 
Bellamy Young born 
Heather Young born 
Shelby Young born 
Barrie Youngfellow born

Z 

Grace Zabriskie born 
Lisa Zane born 
Zarah
Nora Zehetner born 
Heidi Zeigler born 
Renée Zellweger born 
Jacklyn Zeman born 
Zendaya born 
Mackenzie Ziegler born 
Maddie Ziegler born 
Madeline Zima born 
Vanessa Zima born 
Yvonne Zima born 
Stephanie Zimbalist born 
Constance Zimmer born 
Kim Zimmer born 
Arianne Zucker born 
Daphne Zuniga born

See also
Lists of actors
Lists of Americans

References 

American television
television actresses
American actress
American television
Television